CD Choice is a record label from Bangladesh. CD Choice produces cassettes, CDs, VCDs and DVDs of dramas, television films, movies, and music. CD choice is the largest record label company in Bangladesh. The owner of the company is Jahirul Islam Sohel and the CEO is Ashikul Islam.

History
CD Choice was established in 2006 by Jahirul Islam Sohel. On 2 April 2018, the CD Choice YouTube channel crossed the milestone of 1 million subscribers. This is the country's first institution that received a Golden Play Button from YouTube.

Artists

Musicians

 Habib Wahid
 Imran Mahmudul
 Kazi Shuvo
 Sabrina Porshi
 Mila Islam
 Kazi Shuvo
 Belal Khan
 Kumar Biswajit
 Tahsan Rahman Khan
 Atikur Rahman Mahi
 Liza
 Minar Rahman
 Fahmida Nabi
 Shireen Jawad
 Avraal Sahir
 Masha Islam

Notable albums

 Chithi – Arfin Rumey & Nancy
 Manena Mon – Imran & Puja
 Anmona – Imran & Naumi 
 Ki Jadu Koreso – Andrew Kishor & Kanok Chapa
 Jaan Amar Jaan – SI Tutul & Nancy 
 Ei Bukete – Tausif & Farabi
 Rodela Akash – Kazi Shuvo & Puja
 Paar Koro Tumi – Kumar Biswajit
 Amare Chariya – Tausif
 Na Bola Kotha – Ilias & Orin
 Bhalobashar Porosh – Arfin Rumey & Kheya
 Mon Chuye Dekho – Arfin Rumey & Anonya
 Jibon To Sukher Holo – Shahid & Shuvomita
 Jaan Pakhi – Tausif & Kheya

References

External links
 CD Choice Official Website

Bangladeshi record labels
Record labels established in 2006
2006 establishments in Bangladesh
Entertainment companies established in 2006
Record label distributors